The following is a list of events, births, and deaths in 1934 in Switzerland.

Incumbents
Federal Council:
Giuseppe Motta
Edmund Schulthess 
Jean-Marie Musy then Philipp Etter
Heinrich Häberlin then Johannes Baumann
Marcel Pilet-Golaz (President)
Albert Meyer
Rudolf Minger

Tournaments
1933–34 Nationalliga
FIBT World Championships 1934 took place in Switzerland
FIS Alpine World Ski Championships 1934 took place in Switzerland
1934-35 Nationalliga

Establishments
SC Buochs

Events by Month

January
January 12-William Tell, a film, is released

February

March

April

May

June

July
July 14-July 29-Zürich 1934 chess tournament took place

August
August 26-1934 Swiss Grand Prix took place in Switzerland

September

October
October 2-Switzerland the Beautiful, a documentary, is released

November

December

Other
Via Mala is published
The Berne Trial is in progress, until 1935
The Swiss Banking Act of 1934 majorly affects bank secrecy

Births
Kurt Müller, a sports shooter
February 11 – Hans Bässler, a fencer
February 14 – Michel Corboz, conductor
February 15 – Niklaus Wirth, a computer scientist
February 18 – Peter Zeindler, journalist, novelist and playwright.
June 30 – Ursula Bagdasarjanz, violinist
August 13 – Karl Elsener, a football (association football) goalkeeper (d. July 27, 2010)
October 19 – Ernst Hürlimann, a rower
November 19 – Paul Glass, an American-Swiss composer

Deaths
César Roux, a surgeon
August 26-Hugh Hamilton, a British racing driver, is killed at the Swiss Grand Prix

References

 
1934 in Swiss sport
1934 in Europe
Years of the 20th century in Switzerland